Yoshitomo is a masculine Japanese given name.

Possible writings
Yoshitomo can be written using many different combinations of kanji characters. Here are some examples: 

義友, "justice, friend"
義朋, "justice, friend"
義智 / 義知, "justice, intellect"
義朝, "justice, morning"
吉友, "good luck, friend"
吉朋, "good luck, friend"
吉智 / 吉知, "good luck, intellect"
吉朝, "good luck, morning"
善友, "justice, friend"
善朋, "justice, friend"
善智 / 善知, "justice, intellect"
善朝, "justice, morning"
芳友, "fragrant/virtuous, friend"
芳朋, "fragrant/virtuous, friend"
芳智 / 芳知, "fragrant/virtuous, intellect"
芳朝, "fragrant/virtuous, morning"
好友, "good/like something, friend"
慶友, "congratulate, friend"
慶智 / 慶知, "congratulate, intellect"
慶朝, "congratulate, morning"
由智 / 由知, "reason, intellect"
由朝, "reason, morning"
良智 / 良知, "good, intellect"

The name can also be written in hiragana よしとも or katakana ヨシトモ.

Notable people with the name

, Japanese samurai
, Japanese artist
, Japanese baseball player
, Japanese baseball player
, Japanese writer
, Japanese anime director

See also
3733 Yoshitomo, a main-belt asteroid

Japanese masculine given names